Bombworks Records is a record label from McKinney, Texas, that formed in January 2004. The label would sign several bands, including Seventh Angel, A Hill to Die Upon, Grave Declaration and Crimson Thorn. The label started careers for bands such as Holy Blood.

Current Artists
 Antestor
 Azmaveth
 Deus Invictus
 Disaffection
 Faithbomb
 Grave Declaration
 Pale Horse
 Requital
 Seventh Angel
 Sympathy
 Tortured Conscience
 Venia

Former Artists

Active
 A Hill to Die Upon (Luxor Records)
 Angel 7 (Vision of God)
 Bloodline Severed (Independent)
 Consecrator (Roxx)
 Dagon (Luxor Records)
 Deliverance (Roxx)
 Divulgence (changed their name to Marrow of Earth; Independent)
 Halcyon Way (Nightmare)
 Holy Blood (Vision of God)
 Hortor
 Illuminandi (MocneRamie)
 In Grief (changed their name to Recreate the Sun; Independent)
 Lament (Vision of God)
 Lo-Ruhamah (I, Voidhanger)
 Monolith
 Monotheist (SkyBurnsBlack)
 My Silent Wake (Opa Voka)
 The Drowning

Disbanded
 Amos
 Armageddon Holocaust
 Asher
 Bealiah
 Dark Endless
 Dark Lay Still
 Darkness Before Dawn
 Encryptor
 Fearscape
 Hope Has Failed Us
 I Am the Messenger
 Luminaria
 Penny for the Old Guy
 Royal Anguish
 Seven Angels
 Skies
 SorrowStorm
 The Souls Unrest
 Евроклідон
 Xnihilio

Hiatus
 Adiastasia
 Century Sleeper
 Common Yet Forbidden
 Crimson Thorn
 Nocturnal Faith
 Usynlig Tumult

References

External links

American record labels
Christian record labels
Record labels established in 2004
Heavy metal record labels